This Is Walt Dickerson! is the debut album led by vibraphonist and composer Walt Dickerson recorded in 1961 and released on the New Jazz label.

Reception

The AllMusic reviewer stated: "A striking debut, This Is Walt Dickerson! sets the stage for continued excellence, but also proves that Dickerson's talent was already fully formed." DownBeat reviewer Don DeMichael wrote: "Dickerson plays the whole instrument, not just part of it. But more important than his approach to the instrument is Dickerson's approach to music. The challenge he throws at himself and the listener outweighs other considerations one might have... what he offers in this album is far above the usual. ...This album is experience-giving and provocative."

Track listing 
All compositions by Walt Dickerson
 "Time" - 6:29
 "Elizabeth" - 5:07
 "The Cry" - 7:01
 "Death and Taxes" - 6:06
 "Evelyn" - 6:14
 "Infinite You" - 7:01

Personnel 
Walt Dickerson - vibraphone
Austin Crowe – piano
Bob Lewis – bass
Andrew Cyrille – drums

References 

Walt Dickerson albums
1961 albums
Albums produced by Esmond Edwards
Albums recorded at Van Gelder Studio
New Jazz Records albums